Gander Bay is a natural bay located on the island of Newfoundland, in the Canadian province of Newfoundland and Labrador.

Gander Bay takes its name from the lake and river which terminates within the inner reaches of this bay.

Communities
 Rodgers Cove
 Wings Point
 Dormans Cove
 Clarke's Head
 Gander Bay South
 Main Point
 Davidsville
 Beaver Cove
 Victoria Cove

Bays of Newfoundland and Labrador